Riopelle is a surname. Notable people with the surname include:

Howard Riopelle (1922–2013), Canadian ice-hockey player
Jean-Paul Riopelle (1923–2002), Canadian painter and sculptor
Jerry Riopelle (1941–2018), American musician and record producer

See also
Le Riopelle de l'Isle, cheese named for Jean-Paul Riopelle